Michael Mensah (born July 5, 1981) is a Ghanaian football striker.

Career 
Having played for Rakuunat in Finland, Mensah joined Swedish side Trelleborgs FF in 2006. In January 2009, after three years at Trelleborgs FF, he moved to Syrianska FC.

Since December 2011, he joined Thanh Hóa F.C. in Vietnamese Super League under the name Andrew.

References

External links 
 
  (profile 1)
  (profile 2)

Living people
1981 births
Ghanaian footballers
FC Jokerit players
Ghanaian expatriate footballers
Association football forwards
Expatriate footballers in Finland
Expatriate footballers in Vietnam
V.League 1 players
Thanh Hóa FC players
Expatriate footballers in Sweden
Allsvenskan players
Syrianska FC players
Trelleborgs FF players